Jonathan Mark Lawrence, FRHistS (born 1961) is a British historian. Since 2019, he has been Professor of Modern British History at the University of Exeter.

Early life and education 
Born in 1961, he attended King's College, Cambridge; after graduating with a Bachelor of Arts degree in 1983, he completed doctoral studies. In 1989, he was awarded a Doctor of Philosophy degree for his thesis "Party Politics and the People: Continuity and Change in the Political History of Wolverhampton, 1815–1914", which was supervised by Gareth Stedman Jones.

Career 
Lawrence subsequently taught at University College London and the University of Liverpool before he was appointed a university lecturer in modern British history at the University of Cambridge and a fellow of Emmanuel College, Cambridge, in 2004. He was promoted to a senior lectureship in 2006 and to a readership in 2011. In 2017, he moved to the University of Exeter to be an associate professor; he was promoted to be Professor of Modern British History in 2019.

As of 2021, he is a fellow of the Royal Historical Society. In 2017, he gave the annual Neale Lecture at University College London on the topic "The Culture Wars of Class in Post-War Britain".

Bibliography 
Books

Thesis

Peer-reviewed articles and chapters

References 

1961 births
English historians
Social historians
Political historians
Historians of the British Isles
Alumni of King's College, Cambridge
Academics of University College London
Academics of the University of Liverpool
Fellows of Emmanuel College, Cambridge
Academics of the University of Exeter
Fellows of the Royal Historical Society
Living people